Baita may refer to:

Romania
Communes and villages
Băița, Hunedoara, a commune in Hunedoara County
Băița and Băița-Plai, villages in Nucet town, Bihor County
Băița, a village in Gherla town, Cluj County
Băița, a village in Tăuții-Măgherăuș town, Maramureș County
Băița, a village in Lunca Commune, Mureș County
Băița de sub Codru, a commune in Maramureș County

Other places
Băița mine, open pit mine in Bihor County
Băița (Fleț), tributary of the Fleț in Mureș County
Băița, tributary of the Pârâul Galben in Gorj County
Băița (Lăpuș), tributary of the Lăpuș in Maramureș County

China
Within China, Baita or Bai Ta (Chinese: , lit. "White Tower") may refer to:

Places
Baita District (白塔区), Liaoyang, Liaoning
Baita railway station, railway station in Hohhot, Inner Mongolia on the Beijing-Baotou Line

 Hohhot Baita International Airport (呼和浩特白塔国际机场), serving Hohhot, Inner Mongolia

 Wanbu Huayanjing Pagoda, commonly referred to as Baita, located in Hohhot, Inner Mongolia

White Dagoba, located in the Miaoying Temple in Beijing
White Dagoba, located on Jade Flower island in Beihai Park in Beijing
Zhakou White Pagoda in Hangzhou, Zhejiang

Towns
Baita, Jiedong County, in Jiedong County, Guangdong
Baita, Shahe, in Shahe City, Hebei
Baita, Shenyang, in Dongling District, Shenyang, Liaoning
Baita, Zibo, in Boshan District, Zibo, Shandong
Baita, Xianju County, Xianju County, Zhejiang

Townships
Baita Township, Luoyuan County, in Luoyuan County, Fujian
Baita Manchu Ethnic Township (白塔满族乡), Xingcheng, Liaoning

Other
Baita (architecture), small dwellings of the Italian Alps and Apennines
Rabiu Baita (born 1984), Nigerian football player